First Blood is a 1982 film starring Sylvester Stallone also known as "Rambo 1".

First Blood may also refer to:

Books
 "First Blood" (short story), a short story by F. Scott Fitzgerald
 First Blood (novel), a 1972 novel by David Morrell, basis for the 1982 film
 First Blood, a 1953 novel by Jack Schaefer 
 First Blood, a 1993 novel by Claire Rayner
 First Blood, a 2008 novel by Susan Sizemore

Music
 First Blood (band), an American hardcore band
 "First Blood", a song by AC/DC from Fly on the Wall, 1985

Albums
 First Blood (Nobunny album), 2010
 First Blood (Psychopomps album), 1996
 First Blood, an album by Mike Henderson & The Bluebloods, 1996
 1st Blood, an album by The Ricecookers, 2006

Television episodes
 "First Blood" (The Handmaid's Tale)
 "First Blood" (Supernatural)
 "First Blood" (Wentworth)

Other uses
 First Blood match, a type of professional wrestling match
 Rambo (franchise), also known as the First Blood franchise

See also

 First Blood Part II, a 1985 Sylvester Stallone film also called "Rambo 2"
 Menarche, the first menstrual bleeding in female humans
 
 
 First (disambiguation)
 Blood (disambiguation)
 Last Blood (disambiguation)